Sowmaeh Zarrin (also Romanized as Şowma‘eh Zarrīn; also known as Şowme‘eh) is a village in Aghmiyun Rural District, in the Central District of Sarab County, East Azerbaijan Province, Iran. At the 2006 census, its population was 111, in 15 families.

References 

Populated places in Sarab County